This article details the qualifying phase for athletics at the 2024 Summer Olympics. More than 1,800 athletes, with an equal split between men and women, will compete across forty-eight medal events (twenty-five in track, five in the road: marathon and racewalking, sixteen in the field, and two in combined) at the Games. The qualification window for the marathon races will occur from 1 November 2022 to 30 April 2024; for the 10,000 metres, combined events (heptathlon and decathlon), racewalks, and relays from 31 December 2022 to 30 June 2024; and for the remaining events on the program lineup from 1 July 2023 to 30 June 2024.

Qualification summary 
A National Olympic Committee (NOC) may enter a maximum of three qualified athletes in each individual event if all of them meet the entry standard during the qualifying period; and a maximum of one qualified relay team per event. Under the Universality rule, any NOC without a qualified athlete or relay team will be permitted to send the highest-ranked male or highest-ranked female athlete to either of the following individual events, namely the 100 m, 800 m, or the marathon.

Similar to the 2020 edition, the qualification system for Paris 2024 is set on a dual pathway, where the initial half of the total quota (about fifty percent) will be distributed to the athletes through the entry standards approved by the World Athletics council, with the remainder relying on the world ranking list within the qualifying period.

The entry standards may be obtained in various meets organized and approved by the World Athletics within the given timeframe. The qualification period for the marathon races will occur from 1 November 2022 to 30 April 2024; for the 10,000 metres, combined events (heptathlon and decathlon), racewalks, and relays from 31 December 2022 to 30 June 2024, with the rest of the individual track and field events running over an annual period (from 1 July 2023 to 30 June 2024).

For the marathon races, any runner ranked higher than the sixty-fifth-place athlete on the filtered Quota Place "Road to Paris" list on 30 January 2024 will be deemed for immediate selection to his or her respective national team at the Games. Beyond the deadline, the remaining twenty percent of the total quota will be determined by the same dual pathway qualification criteria outlined above without displacing any qualified athletes on the set date.

For the track relays, a maximum of sixteen qualified NOCs are entitled to each event. The top fourteen teams in each relay race at the 2024 World Athletics Relays, scheduled for April or May 2024 in Nassau, Bahamas, will directly book a slot for their corresponding event at the Olympics, while the remaining two teams outside the key qualifier will be selected according to the World Athletics performance list for relays within the qualification period (31 December 2022, to 30 June 2024).

NOCs with more than three qualified athletes in an individual event may select any of them based on their own criteria. For example, the United States selects athletes based on the results achieved at the 2024 U.S. Olympic Trials for track and field but enforces a policy of entering every qualified. Sweden only enters athletes sufficient to reach at least the eighth position, based on the assessment evaluated by the NOC.

For the second consecutive time, World Athletics will publish the qualification tracking tool Road to Paris on the statistics zone of the sport governing body's official website in the last quarter of 2023. This tool will display the list of qualified athletes in each individual and relay event, particularly those officially selected by their respective NOC, either through the entry standards approved by World Athletics or the world ranking.

Entry standards
The entry standards must be obtained at the 2023 World Championships (scheduled for 19 to 27 August in Budapest, Hungary), continental championships, continental athletic meets, national championships and selection trials, and various international meets approved by World Athletics within the given qualification period listed above.

The following table outlines the individual entry standards for Paris 2024:

ª An equivalent to a mile run — 3:50.40 (for men) and 4:20.90 (for women)

Track events

Men's track events

Men's 100 m 
Note: The qualifying standards exclude indoor achievements or races with wind above 2.0 m/s.

Men's 200 m 
Note: The qualifying standards exclude indoor achievements.

Men's 400 m

Men's 800 m

Men's 1500 m 
Note: The qualifying standards also include achievements in the mile run (3:50.40).

Men's 5000 m

Men's 10,000 m

Men's 110 m hurdles 
Note: The qualifying standards exclude indoor achievements or races with wind above 2.0 m/s.

Men's 400 m hurdles

Men's 3000 m steeplechase

Women's track events

Women's 100 m 
Note: The qualifying standards exclude indoor achievements or races with wind above 2.0 m/s.

Women's 200 m 
Note: The qualifying standards exclude indoor achievements.

Women's 400 m

Women's 800 m

Women's 1500 m 
Note: The qualifying standards also include achievements in the mile run (4:20.90).

Women's 5000 m

Women's 10,000 m

Women's 100 m hurdles 
Note: The qualifying standards exclude indoor achievements or races with wind above 2.0 m/s.

Women's 400 m hurdles

Women's 3000 m steeplechase

Road events

Men's road events

Men's marathon

Men's 20 km walk

Women's road events

Women's marathon

Women's 20 km walk

Field events

Men's field events

Men's high jump

Men's pole vault

Men's long jump

Men's triple jump

Men's shot put

Men's discus throw

Men's hammer throw

Men's javelin throw

Women's field events

Women's high jump

Women's pole vault

Women's long jump

Women's triple jump

Women's shot put

Women's discus throw

Women's hammer throw

Women's javelin throw

Combined events

Men's decathlon

Women's heptathlon

Relay events

Men's  relay

Men's  relay

Women's  relay

Women's  relay

Mixed  relay

Mixed 35 km walk team

References

Qualification for the 2024 Summer Olympics
Qualification